Cynarine is a hydroxycinnamic acid derivative and a biologically active chemical constituent of artichoke (Cynara cardunculus).

Chemically, it is an ester formed from quinic acid and two units of caffeic acid.

See also 
 Chlorogenic acid

References 

Hydroxycinnamic acid esters
Hydroxycinnamic acid glycosides
Quinic acid esters
Catechols
Vinylogous carboxylic acids